The Liaozhong Ring Expressway, officially the Central Liaoning Ring Expressway and designated G91, is an orbital expressway encircling the city of Shenyang and central Liaoning in the People's Republic of China. Construction began in 2005, and the expressway was completed in December 2018.

Route
The kilometre zero marker of the expressway is located at an interchange with the G1113 Dandong–Fuxin Expressway south of the city centre of Benxi. The expressway encircles around the various counties and cities that surround the city of centre of Shenyang, with the kilometre posts increasing clockwise. The expressway does not actually reach into the city center of Shenyang itself. Clockwise from Benxi, these are:
 Benxi
 Liaoyang
 Liaozhong County
 Xinmin
 Tieling
 Fushun
 Back to Benxi

References

Chinese national-level expressways
Expressways in Liaoning